Louise Christie (born 22 September 2000) is a British rhythmic gymnast. She is the 2022 Commonwealth Games silver medalist with ribbon.

Personal life 
Christie took up the sport at age five after her mother signed her up for gymnastics, not realizing it was rhythmic, and as of 2022 she trains four hours per day. Her gymnastics idols are Salome Pazhava and Linoy Ashram, other athletes she admires are Simone Biles, Tom Daley and Andy Murray as they had to face challenges to achieve success. She’s studying Applied Sport & Exercise Science at Robert Gordon University in Aberdeen.

Career 
Louise was included into Great Britain's national team in 2019, when she was selected to compete at the Portimão International Tournament, becoming the first Scottish gymnast to represent the country since 2013.

In April 2022 she participated at the World Cup in Tashkent, she was 17th in the All-Around, 16th with hoop, 21st with ball, 14th with clubs and 15th with ribbon. Louise then won three medals at the British Championships in Telford, silver in the All-Around and with clubs as well as gold with ribbon. A few weeks later she made her European Championships debut  along teammates Marfa Ekimova and Alice Leaper the senior national group and juniors Melissa Toma, Elizaveta Andreeva and Nicole Kalnina, performing with hoop, ball and ribbon in Tel Aviv, she ranked 16th in teams, 45th in the All-Around, 60th with hoop, 29th with ball, 39th with ribbon. In early August Christie won an historical silver medal with ribbon at the Commonwealth Games in Birmingham, the best results in rhythmic gymnastics for Scotland.  She then took part in the World Cup in Cluj-Napoca, finishing 32nd in the All-Around, 37th with hoop, 34th with ball, 26th with clubs and 34th with ribbon.

Achievements 

 First Scottish rhythmic gymnast to win a silver medal at the Commonwealth Games.

References 

2000 births
Living people
British rhythmic gymnasts
Commonwealth Games medallists in gymnastics
Commonwealth Games silver medallists for Scotland
Commonwealth Games competitors for Scotland
Gymnasts at the 2022 Commonwealth Games
Alumni of Robert Gordon University
Medallists at the 2022 Commonwealth Games